Bridget Hodson is an English actress better known for her roles of Elaine in the mini-series The Mists of Avalon and Ilsa Haupstein in the film Hellboy. She used the stage name Biddy Hodson from 1983 to 2004 and her name Bridget Hodson from 2004 onwards.

Filmography

References

External links
 

English film actresses
English television actresses
Living people
Year of birth missing (living people)